Chennebrun is a commune in the Eure department in northern France.

Population

See also
 Communes of the Eure department
 Château de Chennebrun

References

Communes of Eure